The International Studies Association (ISA) is a US-based professional association for scholars and practitioners in the field of international studies. Founded in 1959, ISA has been headquartered at the University of Connecticut in Storrs since 2015. Its executive director is Mark A. Boyer. It has been a member of the International Science Council since 1984.

ISA has more than 7,000 members in over 100 countries and describes itself as "one of the oldest interdisciplinary associations dedicated to understanding international, transnational and global affairs." ISA encompasses six geographic subdivisions (regions), 29 thematic groups (sections), and four caucuses, providing opportunities to exchange ideas and research with local colleagues and within specific subject areas. ISA's annual convention routinely draws over 6,000 attendees.

ISA publishes seven academic journals (International Studies Quarterly, International Studies Review, International Studies Perspectives, Foreign Policy Analysis, International Political Sociology, Journal of Global Security Studies, and Global Studies Quarterly) and co-sponsors an eighth (International Interactions). ISA also publishes the Oxford Research Encyclopedia of International Studies in conjunction with Oxford University Press and maintains other online resources. Since 1981, it has awarded the Karl Deutsch Award to scholars under age 40 or within ten years of defending their doctoral dissertation.

In 2014, ISA came under criticism for a proposed ban on blogging by its journals' editors.

List of presidents

 Minos Generales (1959–1961)
 Wesley Posvar (1961–1962)
 Fred Sondermann (1962–1963)
 Ross Berkes (1963–1964)
 John Grange (1964–1966)
 Vernon Van Dyke (1966–1967)
 F. Field Haviland Jr. (1967–1968)
 William Olson (1968–1969)
 Robert North (1969–1970)
 Norman Palmer (1970–1971)
 Richard C. Snyder (1971–1972)
 William T.R. Fox (1972–1973)
 Alexander George (1973–1974)
 Kenneth Boulding (1974–1975)
 Richard Rosecrance (1975–1976)
 Vincent Davis (1976–1977)
 Herbert Kelman (1977–1978)
 Chadwick F. Alger (1978–1979)
 Ole Holsti (1979–1980)
 Dina Zinnes (1980–1981)
 Henry Teune (1981–1982)
 Harold K. Jacobson (1982–1983)
 Bruce Russett (1983–1984)
 James N. Rosenau (1984–1985)
 J. David Singer (1985–1986)
 Kal J. Holsti (1986–1987)
 Harold Guetzkow (1987–1988)
 Robert Keohane (1988–1989)
 Charles F. Hermann (1989–1990)
 Helga Haftendorn (1990–1991)
 Maurice East (1991–1992)
 Hayward R. Alker Jr. (1992–1993)
 Charles Kegley Jr. (1993–1994)
 Ted R. Gurr (1994–1995)
 Susan Strange (1995–1996)
 Davis Bobrow (1996–1997)
 James A. Caporaso (1997–1998)
 Margaret G. Hermann (1998–1999)
 Michael Brecher (1999–2000)
 Craig Murphy (2000–2001)
 Bruce Bueno de Mesquita (2001–2002)
 John A. Vasquez (2002–2003)
 Steve Smith (2003–2004)
 Jacek Kugler (2004–2005)
 William Thompson (2005–2006)
 J. Ann Tickner (2006–2007)
 Jack Levy (2007–2008)
 Nils Petter Gleditsch (2008–2009)
 Thomas G. Weiss (2009–2010)
 David A. Lake (2010–2011)
 Beth Simmons (2011–2012)
 Etel Solingen (2012–2013)
 Harvey Starr (2013–2014)
 Amitav Acharya (2014–2015)
 Paul Diehl (2015–2016)
 T. V. Paul (2016–2017)
 Brett Ashley Leeds (2017–2018)
 Patrick James (2018–2019)
 Cameron G. Thies (2019–2020)
 Helen V. Milner (2020–2021)
 Kristian Skrede Gleditsch (2021–2022)

References

External links
 International Studies Association
 ISA Publications

Organizations established in 1959
International professional associations
Members of the International Science Council
University of Connecticut
International relations
Non-profit organizations based in Connecticut